The Similars is a 2015 Mexican supernatural thriller film written and directed by Isaac Ezban.  It stars Gustavo Sánchez Parra, Cassandra Ciangherotti, Fernando Becerril, Humberto Busto, Carmen Beato, Santiago Torres, and María Elena Olivares as people who are trapped by a hurricane at a bus station around the time of the Tlatelolco massacre in 1968.  As the passengers wait for a bus to arrive, they are horrified to find that everyone's face is slowly transforming.  The Similars premiered at Fantastic Fest in September 2015.  It was released in Mexico in October 2016.

Plot 
Ulises becomes frustrated when he is stuck in a bus depot during a massive storm while his wife gives birth in nearby Mexico City. The elderly clerk, Martin, tells him that the storm has temporarily stopped the bus service. Intermittent broadcasts on Martin's radio report increasingly worse news, eventually revealing that the storm is suspected to be a worldwide phenomenon of unknown origin. Ulises attempts to call the hospital with the station's payphone, only to be disconnected after a brief exchange that only worries him further. Ulises asks to use Martin's phone, but Martin says he does not have an outside line.

Irene, a pregnant woman, takes shelter in the bus station. As she becomes flustered with Martin's disinterest in their plight, Ulises assists her and suggests she try to call for a taxi with the payphone. When she reports it is on the way, Ulises excitedly offers to share the fare with her. Ulises asks an older woman, Roberta, if she is also interested in sharing the fare, but she becomes agitated and responds in a language Ulises cannot understand. While they wait for the taxi, Irene goes to the restroom, where a cleaning woman, Rosa, surprises her and insists that she stay at the station. While Irene attempts to flee Rosa, Rosa has what appears to be an epileptic seizure.

At the same time, three more people arrive at the station: Alvaro, Gertrudis, and Gertrudis's son, Ignacio. Hearing Irene's calls for help, the others assist her. Martin, his face covered in bandages, comes out of his office with a rifle and blames everything on Ulises. Confused, Ulises says he is just a miner who is worried about his wife. As Martin continues to rant, Roberta has the same epileptic seizure as Rosa. Alvaro and Ulises disarm Martin. As Ulises ties up Martin, Alvaro assists Roberta. Alvaro, a medical student, becomes concerned when he sees Gertrudis inject Ignacio with an hypodermic needle. She insists Ignacio needs regular doses to remain calm.

After Alvaro excitedly recognizes Ignacio as a famous unsolved medical case, Ulises and Alvaro argue over their opposing political beliefs. All are stunned when Martin recovers and reveals that his face has morphed to look exactly like Ulises. Roberta, too, begins to show signs of facial hair similar to Ulises. Alvaro wrestles the rifle from Ulises and accuses him of being a government agent. Ulises insists he does not understand what the others are talking about, but they become panicked when Irene also transforms. Fearing that it is contagious, Alvaro attempts to leave the station, only to find the doors are both locked and bulletproof.

Alvaro and Irene investigate Martin's office at his urging. They find that all the photographs, statues, and posters now have Ulises's face. Ignacio locks Gertrudis and Martin in a back room, where Rosa has transformed and committed suicide. Ignacio shows Ulises a comic book about aliens who, instead of conquering Earth, steal humanity's individuality. Once everyone has transformed, humanity's memory is wiped, and the humans once again perceive themselves as individuals, not knowing they have lost their individuality. When Gertrudis escapes, she explains that Ignacio has caused the comic book to come true.

Ignacio reveals he was preventing them from leaving. When the others confront him, Ignacio uses his ability to change reality to stop them. As Ulises dies, he claims to not recognize the others' faces. In his wallet, they find a picture of Ulises, which they perceive as not looking like the bearded clone everyone else has transformed into; they surmise he was the first to transform. Irene dies during childbirth, and her baby has the cloned face. Ignacio collapses, and Roberta examines him. She says he made contact with the aliens and, not believing them to be real, mistakenly allowed them to control him. Gertrudis asks Roberta what to do next. Roberta replies, "Nothing."

Some time later, the police arrive and arrest Alvaro, blaming him for the deaths. Gertrudis and Ignacio leave for Tlatelolco, Mexico City. Narration announces that with few exceptions, Ignacio is the only one to remember or know what has happened, much like the comic book.

Cast 
 Gustavo Sánchez Parra as Ulises
 Cassandra Ciangherotti as Irene
 Fernando Becerril as Martin
 Humberto Busto as Alvaro
 Carmen Beato as Gertrudis
 Santiago Torres as Ignacio
 Maria Elena Olivares as Roberta
 Catalina Salas as Rosa

Production 
Writer-director Isaac Ezban was influenced by The Twilight Zone.  Like that show, he said he wanted to make a thriller that focused primarily on the characters.  Ezban wrote the script in 2011, and shooting began on 7 July 2014 in Mexico City and Puebla.  Ezban considered shooting in black and white but instead used desaturated colors.  Besides The Twilight Zone, Ezban was inspired by The Box, which he said looks otherworldly because of its desaturated colors.  The film is not overly political, but Ezban wanted to include references to the Tlatelolco massacre as a plot point to homage the socially conscious films of the 1960s while giving it a uniquely Mexican flavor.

Release 
The Similars premiered at Fantastic Fest in September 2015.  It was released in Mexico in October 2016.

Reception 

Rotten Tomatoes, a review aggregator, reports that 95% of 19 surveyed critics gave the film a positive review; the average rating is 7.2/10.  Dennis Harvey of Variety compared it to the 1961 Twilight Zone episode It's a Good Life, calling it "disappointingly familiar" but a "canny homage".  Kim Newman of Screen Daily wrote, "Funny, suspenseful, inventive and charming, this knows when to tone down the homage and become genuinely frightening".  Madeleine Koestner of Fangoria rated it 3/4 stars and wrote that the film "sells its silliness as scary, and by the end, you believe this ridiculous occurrence is really terrifying".

References

External links 
 

2015 films
2010s supernatural thriller films
2010s Spanish-language films
Mexican supernatural thriller films
Films set in Mexico
Films set in 1968
Films shot in Mexico City
2010s Mexican films